SIMBA Telecom Pte Ltd, formerly known as TPG Singapore, is a Singaporean telecommunications company and one of four major telcommunication company operating in the country. Founded in 2016 by an Australian businessman, David Teoh, after winning an auction from IMDA for its airwaves rights. It was a subsidiary of TPG Telecom Australia.

In 2020, with the merger of TPG Australia's merger with Vodafone, TPG Singapore was split from its Australian counterpart, and is now operating under the newly established and Australian-listed Tuas Ltd independently of the merged TPG Telecom entity. In 2022, TPG Singapore was rebranded to SIMBA Telecom after the usage rights to TPG expired.

History

2016–2019: Founding as TPG Singapore
On 14 December 2016, it was announced that TPG had secured the fourth telecommunications license in Singapore for S$105 million (A$122 million). The reserve price was only S$35 million, and TPG Singapore paid three times the minimum that was asked for by the Singapore authorities.

They were provisionally allocated 60 MHz of spectrum made available in the New Entrant Spectrum Auction (NESA), with spectrum rights that commenced in April 2017. TPG was also expected to provide street level coverage nationwide within 18 months of the start date.

On 21 December 2018, a call for 20,000 participants in a year-long trial was put out, with another call for participants made in March 2019 while delaying the launch of the network to 2020.

For voice communications, it makes use of Voice over LTE technology which saw subscribers have initial troubles setting up during the trial rollout at the start of 2019 as existing phones did not contain the configuration profile required for the VoLTE functionality to work. These was largely resolved when the major brands added the configuration profile into their operating systems, with Apple adding the profile only in September 2019.

In July 2019, a study by Opensignal found that TPG Singapore had slower network speeds and poorer connectivity than the established rival telcos.

2020–present: Post merger of TPG Australia and Vodafone and rebrand to SIMBA

TPG launched commercial service in March 2020.

Tuas Limited was incorporated in Australia on 11 March 2020 in anticipation of demerger of the Singapore operations of TPG Telecom Limited (subsequently renamed to TPG Corporation Limited) resulting from the merger between TPG Telecom and Vodafone Hutchison Australia. That merger attained final court approval on 26 June 2020 with the demerger of TPG Singapore becoming effective and under whose terms Tuas Limited has the rights to use the TPG brand in Singapore until June 2022.

In November 2021, Infocomm Media Development Authority (IMDA)  announced that the telco has won the rights to the 2.1GHz spectrum of 5G network and services and is provisionally awarded two lots of 5MHz of the spectrum. With accordance to IMDA, TPG Singapore would have the rights to provide 5G network services, starting 1 January 2022. As part of the regulatory process, TPG Singapore has to roll out the 5G network islandwide by the end of 2026.

In April 2022, TPG Singapore was rebranded to SIMBA Telecom after the end of its 2 years' usage rights to use the TPG brand.

Network

References

External links 

 

Telecommunications companies established in 2016
Internet in Singapore
Mobile phone companies of Singapore
Companies listed on the Australian Securities Exchange
Singaporean companies established in 2016